Spaghetti alle vongole, Italian for "spaghetti with clams", is a dish that is very popular throughout Italy, especially in Campania (where it is part of traditional Neapolitan cuisine).

Types of clams
Palourde, or carpet-shell clams, vongola verace, are used; or the small, Mediterranean wedge shell (Donax trunculus), also known as the Tellina or "bean clam". Both types are also called arselle in Liguria and Tuscany. In America small cherrystone clams may be substituted.

Preparation
Italians prepare this dish two ways: in bianco, i.e., with oil, garlic, parsley, and sometimes a splash of white wine; and in rosso, like the former but with tomatoes and fresh basil, the addition of tomatoes being more frequent in the south. Traditionally, the bivalves are cooked quickly in hot olive oil to which plenty of garlic has been added. The live clams open during cooking, releasing a liquid that serves as the primary flavoring agent. The clams are then added to the firm pasta (spaghetti, linguine, or vermicelli), along with salt, black pepper (or red pepper), and a handful of finely chopped parsley.

Regional variations
In the Liguria region of Italy, east of Genoa, Spaghetti alle vongole (veraci) means spaghetti with tiny baby clams in the shell, no more than the size of a thumbnail, with a white wine/garlic sauce. Linguine also may be used for the pasta in preference to spaghetti.

Italian-American recipes sometimes use cream in this dish, but in its area of origin this would be considered most unorthodox. Gillian Riley considers cream alien to the spirit of Italian cooking, remarking that, "the way cream dumbs down flavor and texture is not appropriate to the subtle flavor and consistency of pasta.".

In America cheese is sometimes added to this dish, although Italians believe it overpowers the simple flavors of the clams and of good quality olive oil.

See also

 List of Italian dishes
 List of pasta dishes

References

External links
 
 

Clam dishes
Spaghetti dishes
Neapolitan cuisine
Italian seafood dishes